The 1981 Rhode Island Rams football team represented the University of Rhode Island in the 1981 NCAA Division I-AA football season. They were led by sixth-year head coach Bob Griffin and played their home games at Meade Stadium. They competed as a member of the Yankee Conference.

Finishing conference play with a 4–1 record, the Rams were named Yankee Conference co-champions with UMass. With their win over UMass, the Rams received the automatic bid to the NCAA Division I-AA Playoffs, marking Rhode Island's first ever playoff appearance.

Schedule

References

Rhode Island
Rhode Island Rams football seasons
Yankee Conference football champion seasons
Rhode Island Rams football